Anchylobela acidnias is a species of snout moth in the genus Anchylobela. It was described by Alfred Jefferis Turner in 1904, and is known from Australia.

References

Moths described in 1904
Anerastiini
Moths of Australia